Transdisciplinarity connotes a research strategy that crosses many disciplinary boundaries to create a holistic approach. It applies to research efforts focused on problems that cross the boundaries of two or more disciplines, such as research on effective information systems for biomedical research (see bioinformatics), and can refer to concepts or methods that were originally developed by one discipline, but are now used by several others, such as ethnography, a field research method originally developed in anthropology but now widely used by other disciplines.
The Belmont Forum elaborated that a transdisciplinary approach is enabling inputs and scoping across scientific and non-scientific stakeholder communities and facilitating a systemic way of addressing a challenge. This includes initiatives that support the capacity building required for the successful transdisciplinary formulation and implementation of research actions.

Usage
Transdisciplinarity has two common meanings:

German usage
In German-speaking countries, Transdisziplinarität refers to the integration of diverse forms of research, and includes specific methods for relating knowledge in problem-solving. A 2003 conference held at the University of Göttingen showcased the diverse meanings of multi-, inter- and transdisciplinarity and made suggestions for converging them without eliminating present usages.

When the very nature of a problem is under dispute, transdisciplinarity can help determine the most relevant problems and research questions involved. A first type of question concerns the cause of the present problems and their future development (system knowledge). Another concerns which values and norms can be used to form goals of the problem-solving process (target knowledge). A third relates to how a problematic situation can be transformed and improved (transformation knowledge). Transdisciplinarity requires adequate addressing of the complexity of problems and the diversity of perceptions of them, that abstract and case-specific knowledge are linked, and that practices promote the common good.

Transdisciplinarity arises when participating experts interact in an open discussion and dialogue, giving equal weight to each perspective and relating them to each other. This is difficult because of the overwhelming amount of information involved, and because of incommensurability of specialized languages in each field of expertise. To excel under these conditions, researchers need not only in-depth knowledge and know-how of the disciplines involved, but skills in moderation, mediation, association and transfer.

Wider usage
Transdisciplinarity is also used to signify a unity of knowledge beyond disciplines.

Jean Piaget introduced this usage of the term in 1970, and in 1987, the International Center for Transdisciplinary Research (CIRET) adopted the Charter of Transdisciplinarity at the 1st World Congress of Transdisciplinarity, Convento da Arrabida, Portugal, November 1994.

In the CIRET approach, transdisciplinarity is radically distinct from interdisciplinarity. Interdisciplinarity, like pluridisciplinarity, concerns the transfer of methods from one discipline to another, allowing research to spill over disciplinary boundaries, but staying within the framework of disciplinary research.

As the prefix "trans" indicates, transdisciplinarity concerns that which is at once between the disciplines, across the different disciplines, and beyond each individual discipline. Its goal is the understanding of the present world, of which one of the imperatives is the overarching unity of knowledge.

Another critical defining characteristic of transdisciplinary research is the inclusion of stakeholders in defining research objectives and strategies in order to better incorporate the diffusion of learning produced by the research. Collaboration between stakeholders is deemed essential – not merely at an academic or disciplinary collaboration level, but through active collaboration with people affected by the research and community-based stakeholders. In such a way, transdisciplinary collaboration becomes uniquely capable of engaging with different ways of knowing the world, generating new knowledge, and helping stakeholders understand and incorporate the results or lessons learned by the research.

Transdisciplinarity is defined by Basarab Nicolescu through three methodological postulates: the existence of levels of Reality, the logic of the included middle, and complexity. In the presence of several levels of Reality the space between disciplines and beyond disciplines is full of information. Disciplinary research concerns, at most, one and the same level of Reality; moreover, in most cases, it only concerns fragments of one level of Reality. On the contrary, transdisciplinarity concerns the dynamics engendered by the action of several levels of Reality at once. The discovery of these dynamics necessarily passes through disciplinary knowledge. While not a new discipline or a new superdiscipline, transdisciplinarity is nourished by disciplinary research; in turn, disciplinary research is clarified by transdisciplinary knowledge in a new, fertile way. In this sense, disciplinary and transdisciplinary research are not antagonistic but complementary. As in the case of disciplinarity, transdisciplinary research is not antagonistic but complementary to multidisciplinarity and interdisciplinarity research.

According to Nicolescu, transdisciplinarity is nevertheless radically distinct from multidisciplinarity and interdisciplinarity because of its goal, the understanding of the present world, which cannot be accomplished in the framework of disciplinary research. The goal of multidisciplinarity and interdisciplinarity always remains within the framework of disciplinary research. If transdisciplinarity is often confused with interdisciplinarity or multidisciplinarity (and by the same token, we note that interdisciplinarity is often confused with multidisciplinarity) this is explained in large part by the fact that all three overflow disciplinary boundaries. Advocates maintain this confusion hides the huge potential of transdisciplinarity. One of the best known professionals of transdisciplinarity in Argentina is Pablo Tigani, and his concept about transdisciplinarity is:Currently, transdisciplinarity is a consolidated academic field that is giving rise to new applied researches, especially in Latin America and the Caribbean. In this sense, the transdisciplinary and biomimetics research of Javier Collado  on Big History represents an ecology of knowledge between scientific knowledge and the ancestral wisdom of native peoples, such as Indigenous peoples in Ecuador. According to Collado, the transdisciplinary methodology applied in the field of Big History seeks to understand the interconnections of the human race with the different levels of reality that co-exist in nature and in the cosmos, and this includes mystical and spiritual experiences, very present in the rituals of shamanism with ayahuasca and other sacred plants. In abstract, the teaching of Big History in universities of Brazil, Ecuador, Colombia, and Argentina implies a transdisciplinary vision that integrates and unifies diverse epistemes that are in, between, and beyond the scientific disciplines, that is, including ancestral wisdom, spirituality, art, emotions, mystical experiences and other dimensions forgotten in the history of science, specially by the positivist approach.

Transdisciplinary education
Transdisciplinary education is education that brings integration of different disciplines in a harmonious manner to construct new knowledge and uplift the learner to higher domains of cognitive abilities and sustained knowledge and skills. It involves better neural networking for lifelong learning.

Transdisciplinarity has been flagged internationally as an important aim of education. For example, Global Education Magazine, an international journal supported by UNESCO and UNHCR:
"transdisciplinarity represents the capable germ to promote an endogenous development of the evolutionary spirit of internal critical consciousness, where religion and science are complementary. Respect, solidarity and cooperation should be global standards for the entire human development with no boundaries. This requires a radical change in the ontological models of sustainable development, global education and world-society. We must rely on the recognition of a plurality of models, cultures and socio-economical diversification. As well as biodiversity is the way for the emergence of new species, cultural diversity represents the creative potential of world-society."

Influence in disciplines and fields

Arts and humanities

Transdisciplinarity can be found in the arts and humanities. For example, the Planetary Collegium seeks "the development of transdisciplinary discourse in the convergence of art, science, technology and consciousness research." The Plasticities Sciences Arts (PSA) research group also develops transdisciplinary approaches regarding humanities and fundamental sciences relationships as well as the Art & Science field.

Human sciences
The range of transdisciplinarity becomes clear when the four central questions of biological research ((1) causation, (2) ontogeny, (3) adaptation, (4) phylogeny [after Niko Tinbergen 1963, see also Tinbergen's four questions, cf. Aristotle: Causality / Four Major Causes]) are graphed against distinct levels of analysis (e.g. cell, organ, individual, group; [cf. "Laws about the Levels of Complexity" of Nicolai Hartmann 1940/1964, see also Rupert Riedl 1984]):

In this "scheme of transdisciplinarity", all anthropological disciplines (paragraph C in the table of the pdf-file below), their questions (paragraph A: see pdf-file) and results (paragraph B: see pdf-file) can be intertwined and allocated with each other for examples how these aspects go into those little boxes in the matrix, see e.g. the table  This chart includes all realms of anthropological research (no one is excluded). It is the starting point for a systematical order for all human sciences, and also a source for a consistent networking and structuring of their results. This "bio-psycho-social" orientation framework is the basis for the development of the "Fundamental Theory of Human Sciences" and for a transdisciplinary consensus. (In this tabulated orientation matrix the questions and reference levels in italics are also the subject of the humanities.). Niko Tinbergen was familiar with both conceptual categories (i.e. the four central questions of biological research and the levels of analysis), the tabulation was made by Gerhard Medicus. Certainly, a humanist perspective always involves a transdisciplinary focus. A good and classic example of mixing very different sciences was the work developed by Leibniz in seventeenth-eighteenth centuries in order to create a universal system of justice.

Health science 
The term transdisciplinarity is increasingly prevalent in health care research and has been identified as important to improving the effectiveness and efficiency in health care.

See also
 Discipline (academia)
 Interdisciplinarity
 Multidisciplinarity
 Science of team science

References

Citations

Sources 

 Bernard Carmona – Inter and Transdisciplinary international conference – Lisbon 2014 December 11
 Bernard Carmona – ITD14 – Swiss Conference : Inter and Transdisciplinarity 2014
 Bernard Carmona – 
 Bernard Carmona, Ingénium transdisciplinaire – La pratique du débat dans le bouddhisme tibétain, Editions l'Harmattan, 2013
 Bernard Carmona, Le réveil du génie de l'apprenant, Editions l'Harmattan, 2009
 Basarab Nicolescu Manifesto of Transdisciplinarity, State University of New York (SUNY) Press, New York, 2002, translation from French by Karen-Claire Voss.
 Basarab Nicolescu (Ed.) Transdisciplinarity – Theory and Practice, Hampton Press, Cresskill, NJ, USA, 2008.
 Article by Jürgen Mittelstrass entitled On Transdisciplinarity (URL accessed on 6 November 2014)
 ; see also 2017: Being Human – Bridging the Gap between the Sciences of Body and Mind (chapter 1 and 2). Berlin, VWB, 
Javier Collado-Ruano (2018), Co-evolution in Big History: A Transdisciplinary and Biomimetic Approach to the Sustainable Development Goals. Social Evolution & History, 2018 Javier Collado´s official website. 
Javier Collado-Ruano (2016), Cosmodern Education in the Sustainable Development Goals, A Transdisciplinary and Biomimetic Approach from the Big History. TheATLAS. vol. 6, pp. 98–122.
Javier Collado-Ruano (2016), Coevolución en la Gran Historia - una introducción transdisciplinar y biomimética a los Objetivos de Desarrollo Sostenible. Tesis doctoral premiada por la Fundación Columbia como la mejor investigación de América Latina y el Caribe en Ciencia y Espiritualidad del año 2016 Co-evolution in Big History - a transdisciplinary and biomimetic introduction to the Sustainable Development Goals.
Javier Collado-Ruano's TED talk Learning to feel-think-act with Nature
 Bambara, E., "Alle radici della Transdisciplinarità. Edgar Morin e Basarab Nicolescu", PhD Thesis, University of Messina, 2000
 Brand, Frank; Schaller, Franz & Völker, Harald (Hrsg.): Transdisziplinarität. Bestandsaufnahme und Perspektiven. Beiträge zur THESIS-Arbeitstagung im Oktober 2003 in Göttingen. Göttingen: Universitätsverlag, 2004.
 Hirsch Hadorn, Gertrude; Hoffmann-Riem, Holger; Biber-Klemm, Susette; Grossenbacher-Mansuy, Walter; Joye, Dominique; Pohl, Christian; Wiesmann, Urs & Zemp, Elisabeth (Eds.) (2008): Handbook of Transdisciplinary Research, Springer.
 Hamberger, E., Luger, K. (Hrsg.)(2008): Transdisziplinäre Kommunikation. Aktuelle Be-Deutungen im fächerübergreifenden Dialog, Wien: Österr. Kunst- und Kulturverlag, .
 Jaeger J., Scheringer M. 1998. Transdisziplinarität. Problemorientierung ohne Methodenzwang. GAIA 7(1): 10–25.
 Ronald Jones, Interdisciplinarian, The Experience Design Group, Konstfack University of Art Design and Craft, Stockholm, Sweden 
 Max-Neef, Manfred A. "Foundations of Transdisciplinarity" Ecological Economics 53(2005) 5-16.
 Jürgen Mittelstrass: Transdisciplinarity – New Structures in Science, presented at the conference "Innovative Structures in Basic Research" at Schloss Ringberg, 4 October 2000
 Jürgen Mittelstrass: Transdisziplinarität – wissenschaftliche Zukunft und institutionelle Wirklichkeit. 2003 
 V.S.Mokiy, Methodology of transdisciplinarity-4 (solution of complicated multi-factor problems of nature and society) Institute of transdisciplinary technologies, Russia, 2013.
 V.S.Mokiy, Transdisciplinary research of the Big Bang potency transformation in regards to Earth and human beings Institute of transdisciplinary technologies, Russia, 2013.
 Nicolai Hartmann: Der Aufbau der realen Welt, Berlin, 1939 (2nd Ed. 1964), de Gruyter
 Basarab Nicolescu, "Manifesto of Transdisciplinarity", State University of New York Press, New York, USA, 2002, translation from the French by Karen-Claire Voss.
 Pohl, Christian & Hirsch Hadorn, Gertrude (2007): Principles for Designing Transdisciplinary Research – proposed by the Swiss Academies of Arts and Sciences, München: oekom Verlag.
 Rupert Riedl: The Biology of Knowledge. Chichester, 1984, John Wiley
 Thompson Klein, Julie; Grossenbacher-Mansuy, Walter; Häberli, Rudolf; Bill, Alain; Scholz, Roland W.; Welti, Myrtha (Hrsg.) (2001). Transdisciplinarity: Joint problem solving among science, technology, and society. An effective way for managing complexity. Basel: Birkhäuser
 Niko Tinbergen: On Aims and Methods in Ethology. Zeitschrift für Tierpsychologie, 1963, 20: 410–433
 Steinmetz, George. (2007). Transdisciplinarity as a Nonimperial Encounter. Thesis Eleven, 91 (1), 48–65. http://the.sagepub.com/content/91/1/48.short?rss=1&ssource=mfc/
 Stokols, D. (2006). Toward a science of transdisciplinary action research. American Journal of Community Psychology, 38, 63–77. https://doi.org/10.1007%2Fs10464-006-9060-5
 The Science of Team Science – Assessing the value of transdisciplinary research. Supplement issue of the American Journal of Preventive Medicine, August, 2008. http://cancercontrol.cancer.gov/brp/scienceteam/ajpm.html
 Wickson, F., Carew, A.L. & Russell, A.W., 2006, 'Transdisciplinary research: characteristics, quandaries and quality', Futures, vol. 38, no. 9, pp. 1046–1059.

External links
 Integral Research Center
 transdisciplinary-net, Swiss Academies of Arts and Sciences
 Transdisciplinary Case Studies at ETH Zurich
 International Center for Transdisciplinary Research The site of the International Center for Transdisciplinary Research (CIRET). E-zine "Transdisciplinary Encounters".
 Transdisciplinary Studies The book series dedicated to transdisciplinary research.
 
 
 World Knowledge Dialogue Foundation
 Сoncept Russian school of Transdisciplinarity
 Article of the Russian School of Transdisciplinarity 2007-2021
 Books of the Russian School of Transdisciplinarity 2007-2021
 Transdisciplinary Studies at Claremont Graduate University
 PLASTIR : The Transdisciplinary Review of human plasticity
  Journal of the International Association of Transdisciplinary Psychology
 GAIA: Ecological Perspectives for Science and Society A quarterly inter- and transdisciplinary journal for scientists and other interested parties concerned with the causes and analyses of environmental and sustainability problems and their solutions.
  Global Education Magazine disseminate specialized knowledge with multi, inter and transdisciplinary contents, with original works of research, studies, reviews and innovative experiences to improve management and practice of institutions and organizations with humanitarian and philanthropic educational activities. Their preferred writers are come from educational scientific community with international projects, humanitarian and voluntary activities, as well as cooperation and development: Public and Private Educational Institutions, NGOs, Development and Cooperation Associations, International Volunteers, etc

 
Academic discipline interactions
Holism